Daniel C. Waugh is a historian based at the University of Washington. He did his undergraduate work at Yale University, and in 1963 graduated with a B.A. in Physics. In 1965, he finished his Master's on the Regional Studies of the Soviet Union at Harvard University, and seven years later he completed his Ph.D. at the same institution. The same year, 1972, he began his employment at the University of Washington, and has remained there ever since. He taught in three different departments, namely the departments of History, International Studies, and Slavic and East European Languages and Literature until 2006. His main academic interests are Central Asia and medieval and early modern Russia, although he once focused on Ottoman history. He is the director of the Silk Road Seattle project and editor of the annual journal of the Silkroad Foundation.

Publications

Books
 Slavianskie rukopisi Sobraniia grafa F. A. Tolstogo: Materialy k istorii sobraniia i ukazateli nyneshnikh i prezhnikh shifrov (The Slavic Manuscripts in the Collection of Count F. A. Tolstoi: Materials on the History of the Collection and Indexes to the Current and Former Code Numbers), (Zug, Switzerland: Inter Documentation Company, 1977; 2nd ed., Leningrad: Biblioteka Akademii nauk SSSR, 1980)
 The Great Turkes Defiance: On the History of the Apocryphal Correspondence of the Ottoman Sultan in Its Muscovite and Russian Variants, with a foreword by Academician Dmitrii Sergeevich Likhachev, (Columbus, Ohio: Slavica Publishers, 1978)
 (editor), Essays in Honor of A. A. Zimin, Columbus, O.: Slavica: 1985
 (co-editor with M. Holt Ruffin), Civil Society in Central Asia, (Seattle: University of Washington Press, 1999)
 (Contributor; co-editor), Vagabond Life: The Caucasus Writings of George Kennan. Ed. with Intr. and Afterword by Frith Maier, with contributions by Daniel C. Waugh (Seattle, University of Washington Press, 2003)
 Istoriia odnoi knigi: Viatka i "ne-sovremennost'" russkoi kul'tury v epokhu Petra Velikogo (The History of a Book: Viatka and the Non-Modernity of Russian Culture in the Age of Peter the Great), (St. Petersburg: Izdatel'stvo "Dmitrii Bulanin," 2003)

Articles
 "Soviet Watermark Studies–Achievements and Prospects," Kritika, VI/2 (1970), pp. 78–111.
 "On the Origin of the 'Correspondence' between the Sultan and the Cossacks," Recenzija: A Review of Soviet Ukrainian Scholarly Publications, I/2 (1971), pp. 3–46.
 Appendix I to Edward L. Keenan, The Kurbskii-Groznyi Apochrypha: The Seventeenth-Century Genesis of the "Correspondence" Attributed to Prince A. M. Kurbskii and Tsar Ivan IV, (Cambridge, Mass.: Harvard University Press, 1971), pp. 103–151, 226-230, comprising: "De visu Description of Manuscripts Containing the Correspondence"; "The Writings About the Translation of the Savior's Robe to Moscow in 1625: Materials for Further Study"; "Notes on Seventeenth-Century Translations from the Polish Kronika of Alexander Guagnini."
 "Neizvestnyi pamiatnik drevnerusskoi literatury: 'Gramota gosudaria tsaria i velikogo kniazia Ivana Vasil'evicha vsea Rusii k Stepanu, koroliu pol'skomu'" (An Unknown Monument of Old Russian Literature: "Epistle of the Sovereign Tsar and Grand Prince of All Rus' to Stepan, King of Poland"), Arkheograficheskii ezhegodnik za 1971 god, (Moscow, 1972), pp. 357–361.
 "The Publication of Muscovite Kuranty," Kritika, IX/3 (1973), pp. 104–120.
 "K izucheniiu istorii rukopisnogo sobraniia P. M. Stroeva" (Toward the Study of the History of P. M. Stroev's Manuscript Collection.), Trudy Otdela drevnerusskoi literatury, (Instituta russkoi literatury Akademii nauk SSSR [Leningrad]), XXX (1976), pp. 184–203; XXXII (1977), pp. 133–164.
 "The Lessons of the Kurbskii Controversy Regarding the Study and Dating of Old Russian Manuscripts," in Don K. Rowney and G. Edward Orchard, eds., Russian and Slavic History, (Columbus, O.: Slavica Publishers, 1977), pp. 218–237.
 "Azbuka znakami lits: Egyptian Hieroglyphs in the Privy Chancellery Archive," Oxford Slavonic Papers, N. S., X (1977), pp. 46–50 (plus four plates).
 "'Odolenie na Turskoe tsarstvo'–pamiatnik antituretskoi publitsistiki XVII v." ("Victory over the Turkish Empire"—a Monument of Seventeenth-Century Anti-Turkish Propaganda), Trudy Otdela drevnerusskoi literatury, XXXIII (1979), pp. 88–107.
 "Two Unpublished Muscovite Chronicles," Oxford Slavonic Papers, N. S., XII (1979), pp. 1–31.
 "News of the False Messiah: Reports on Shabbetai Zevi in Ukraine and Muscovy," Jewish Social Studies, XLI (1979), 3/4, pp. 301–322.
 "Ioannikii Galiatovs'kyi's Polemics against Islam and Their Muscovite Translations," Harvard Ukrainian Studies, III/IV (1980) (=Eucharisterion: Essays presented to Omeljan Pritsak on his Sixtieth Birthday by his Colleagues and Students), pp. 908–919.
 "A Brilliant Book for the Study of Muscovite History" (on B.M. Kloss, Nikonovskii svod i russkie letopisi XVI-XVII vekov), Russian History, 9/1 (1982), pp. 111–120.
 "A. A. Zimin's Study of the Sources for Medieval and Early Modern Russian History," in Waugh, ed., Essays in Honor of A.. A. Zimin (1985), pp. 1–58.
 "Tekst o nebesnom znamenii 1672 g. (k istorii evropeiskikh sviazei moskovskoi kul'tury poslednei treti XVII v.)" (A Text Concerning Signs in the Heavens in 1672—On the History of European Connections of Muscovite Culture in the Last Third of the Seventeenth Century), in Problemy izucheniia kul'turnogo naslediia [=Festschrift for Academician D. S. Likhachev] (Moscow: Nauka: 1985), pp. 201–208.
 "The Library of Aleksei Mikhailovich," Forschungen zur osteuropäischen Geschichte, 38 (1986), pp. 299–324.
 "The Unsolved Problem of Tsar Ivan IV's Library," Russian History, 14/1-4 (1987), pp. 395–408.
 (Co-author and ed.), "Correspondence Concerning the 'Correspondence,'" in Harvard Ukrainian Studies (=Kamen' Kraeug"l'n". Essays presented to Edward L. Keenan on his Sixtieth Birthday by his Colleagues and Students), XIX (1995, publ. in 1997), pp. 23–65.
 "Anatolii's Miscellany: Its Origins and Migration," in Harvard Ukrainian Studies, XIX (1995), pp. 747–755.
 "Anatolievskii sbornik i problemy viatskogo letopisaniia" (Anatolii's Miscellany and Problems of Viatka Chronicle Writing), in Shvedy i russkii sever: istoriko-kul'turnye sviazi (K 210-letiiu Aleksandra Lavrent'evicha Vitberga). Materialy Mezhdunarodnogo nauchnogo simpoziuma (Kirov, 1997), pp. 336–354 (published also as "K istorii viatskogo letopisaniia" [On the History of Viatka Chronicle Writing], in In Memoriam. Sbornik pamiati Ia. S. Lur'e [St. Petersburg: Antheneum-Feniks, 1997], pp. 303–320).
 "Exploring the 'Kongur Alps'. Unknown Side of Mustagh Ata," The Himalayan Journal, Vol 54 (1998), pp. 25–32, plus 4 photographs.
 "Novoe o 'Povesti o strane Viatskoi'" (New Material Concerning the "Tale about the Viatka Land"), in Evropeiskii Sever v kul'turno-istoricheskom protsesse (K 625-letiiu goroda Kirova), ed. V. V. Nizov (Kirov, 1999), pp. 350–380.
 "K izucheniiu fal'sifikatsii pis'mennykh istochnikov po istorii srednevekovoi Rossii," (Toward the Study of the Falsification of Written Sources for the History of Medieval Russia), Russian History, Vol. 25, Nos 1-2 (1998) [=memorial Festschrift for A. A. Zimin], pp. 11–20; also, "Introduction," pp. 7–10.
 "The 'Mysterious and Terrible Karatash Gorges': Notes and Documents on the Explorations by Stein and Skrine," The Geographical Journal, Vol. 165, No. 3 (1999), pp. 306–320.
 "We Have Never Been Modern: Approaches to the Study of Russia in the Age of Peter the Great," Jahrbücher für Geschichte Osteuropas, N.F., Bd. 49, H. 3 (2001), Ss.321-345.
 "The Authoritarian Politics of Central Asia," in Donald Bragaw and Linda Arkin, eds., The Democratic Process: Promises and Challenges: A resource guide produced for the Democracy Education Exchange Project (DEEP) (The American Forum for Global Education, 2003), pp. 37–53.
 "Religion and Regional Identities: the Case of Viatka and the Miracle-Working Icon of St. Nicholas Velikoretskii," Forschungen zur osteuropäischen Geschichte, Bd. 63 (2004): 259-278.
 "K voprosu o datirovke Velikoretskogo krestnogo khoda," in Gertsenka: Viatskie zapiski (annual of the Kirov Regional Library), Vyp. 6: 128-136.
 "The Physical and Human Geography of Inner Asia in the Early 1920s Through the Eyes and Lens of C. P. Skrine," in Cultural Interaction and Conflict in Central and Inner Asia. Papers presented at the Central and Inner Asia Seminar University of Toronto, 3–4 May 2002 and 23–24 May 2003 (=Toronto Studies in Central and Inner Asia, No. 6) (Toronto: Asian Institute, University of Toronto, 2004): 87-100.

External links
 Daniel Waugh's profile page
 Silk Road Seattle
 Profile on George Mason University "History Resources"

21st-century American historians
21st-century American male writers
Harvard University alumni
University of Washington faculty
Yale College alumni
Historians of Central Asia
Living people
Year of birth missing (living people)
American male non-fiction writers